

The Mil Mi-60MAI is a three-seat light helicopter first seen as a mockup at Moscow Salon in 2001. The mockup shows a three-bladed main rotor, two-bladed tail rotor, and a skid undercarriage with rear wheels on each skid. It is planned to have one or two piston engines (one 195 hp Textron Lycoming HIO-360-F1AD or 237 hp VAZ-426, or two 113 hp Rotax 914F engines).

Proposed aircraft of Russia
Mil aircraft
Soviet and Russian helicopters